Hands over the City is a 1963 drama film directed by Francesco Rosi. It is a story of political corruption in post-World War II Italy.

Plot 
A ruthless Neapolitan land developer and elected city councilman, Edoardo Nottola (Rod Steiger), manages to use political power to make personal profit in a large-scale suburban real-estate deal. However, after the collapse of a residential building, the communist councilman De Vita (Carlo Fermariello) initiates an inquiry into Nottola's possible connection to the accident.

Cast

 Rod Steiger as entrepreneur Edoardo Nottola
 Salvo Randone as De Angeli
 Guido Alberti as Maglione
 Angelo D'Alessandro as Balsamo
 Carlo Fermariello as De Vita
 Marcello Cannavale as Nottola's friend
 Alberto Canocchia as Nottola's friend
 Gaetano Grimaldi Filioli as Nottola's friend
 Dante Di Pinto as the president at the commission of enquiry
 Dany Paris as Maglione's lover
 Alberto Amato as a counsellor
 Franco Rigamonti as a counsellor
 Terenzio Cordova as the inspector
 Vincenzo Metafora as the mayor

Awards 
The film won the Golden Lion award at the 1963 Venice Film Festival.

References

External links 

Hands over the City an essay by Stuart Klawans at the Criterion Collection

1963 films
1960s political drama films
Italian black-and-white films
Films set in Naples
Italian political drama films
1960s Italian-language films
Golden Lion winners
Films directed by Francesco Rosi
Films scored by Piero Piccioni
1963 drama films
1960s Italian films